The Ultimate Collection is a compact disc by Smokey Robinson and The Miracles, released on Motown Records, catalogue 314530857-2, in February 1998.  It is a collection of singles comprising many of the group's greatest hits, with liner notes written by Stu Hackel.

Content
The disc contains seventeen top ten Rhythm and Blues singles chart hits, and nineteen Top 40 hits on the Billboard Hot 100 enjoyed by the Miracles and released on the Motown subsidiary label Tamla Records imprint. The only exception is "Bad Girl," released locally in the Detroit area on the Motown label (the first single under this imprint) but nationally licensed to Chess Records.  Three of the tracks included were B-sides — "Who's Lovin' You," "Choosey Beggar," and "(You Can) Depend on Me" — respectively the flipsides to "Shop Around," "Going to A Go-Go," and "Way Over There," with "Choosey Beggar" charting independently of its A-side on the R&B singles chart. "The Tears of A Clown" had been initially buried as a track on the album Make It Happen in 1967, but to quell clamor for more record releases by the group in the United Kingdom became a belated hit three years later. Issued in the United States shortly thereafter, it was the Miracles' only #1 hit with Smokey Robinson on the American pop singles chart. Years later, the group hit #1 again on the Billboard Pop chart with the smash hit "Love Machine," but by then Robinson had long since left the group, replaced with Billy Griffin. The disc was part of an "Ultimate Collection" series initiated in 1997 by Motown for many of their top-selling classic artists.

Starting in the late 1960s and early 1970s, standard industry practice shifted to a focus on album sales, where a single became less a separate entity and more simply an advertisement for an LP, and a lead single would be pulled off an album as a promotional tool. Prior to this, singles were concentrated upon as a profitable commodity, especially for smaller record labels, and albums were often built around already successful singles. Since Motown fixated on the hit single until the very end of its stay in Detroit, single versions of songs often featured different mixes than versions that would be later placed on albums. Singles were usually mixed "punchier" and "hotter" to sound better on car radios receiving AM broadcast. The single versions are the ones appearing here.

All six original members of The Miracles are pictured on the cover, clockwise from left: Claudette Robinson, her cousin Bobby Rogers, Ronnie White, Smokey Robinson, Marv Tarplin, and Pete Moore .

Personnel: The Miracles
 William "Smokey" Robinson — tenor/falsetto vocals; lead vocals
 Claudette Rogers Robinson — soprano vocals; co-lead vocals on "Way Over There"
 Robert Rogers — second tenor vocals; co-lead vocals on "You've Really Got A Hold On Me"
 Ronald White — baritone vocals
 Warren "Pete" Moore — bass vocals, vocal arrangements
 Marv Tarplin — electric guitar
 The Funk Brothers — instruments
 Members of the Detroit Symphony Orchestra conducted by Gordon Staples — strings

Track listing
Singles chart peak positions from Billboard charts; no R&B chart existed from November 30, 1963, through January 23, 1965.

References

The Miracles compilation albums
1998 compilation albums
Motown compilation albums